Paula Jones is an Australian audio engineer who has worked with Elton John, Michael Hutchence, and Marcella Detroit. She was nominated for the Australian Engineer Of The Year ARIA (Australian Record Industry Association) for her work engineering/mixing the Max Q album with Michael Hutchence. She engineered "Can You Feel The Love Tonight" which went on to win an Academy Award for Best Original Song.

Early life 
Jones grew up in Sydney. She became interested in learning sound when she was 15 and dating a guitarist in a local cover band. She started asking questions to the engineers at every gig.

Professional career 
Jones started her career at Sydney's Rhinoceros Recording Studios where she worked with producers and artists including Chris Thomas, David Nicholas and INXS. She was asked to go to London to assist on a mix Air Studios when she was 22.

In London, she continued working with Chris Thomas engineering for artists such as Elton John and with producers Dave Stewart Eurythmics) and Martin Chambers (The Pretenders). She has worked out of world class studios including AIR Lyndhurst (George Martin) Olympic, The Townhouse and SARM West (Trevor Horn).

The success of the Lion King soundtrack prompted her to move to LA.

While living in LA she partnered with Tony Brock to remix Korn and 311, Rick Rubin for a Puff Daddy remix and she produced and co wrote with Marcella Detroit (Shakespeare's Sister, Eric Clapton). Paula programmed beats and engineered projects for song writers Rick Nowels (Stevie Nicks, Dido) and Billy Steinberg (I'll Stand By You, Like A Virgin). She has also worked with Charlie Clouser on projects with Rob Zombie and others.

Credits include - 
Elton John - Circle Of Life - Engineer
In The Dark - indie horror film score composition
Tyler Conti - Debut album - Engineer

Personal life 
She has one child and resides in Australia.

References

External links 

Year of birth missing (living people)
Living people
Women audio engineers
Australian record producers
Australian women record producers